The 2018–19 Division 1 Féminine season was the 45th edition since its establishment. Lyon were the defending champions, having won the title in each of the past twelve seasons. The season began on 25 August 2018 and ended on 4 May 2019.

Teams

Two teams were promoted from the Division 2 Féminine, the second level of women's football in France, to replace two teams that were relegated from the Division 1 Féminine following the 2017–18 season. A total of 12 teams currently compete in the league; two clubs will be relegated to the second division at the end of the season.

Teams promoted to 2018–19 Division 1 Féminine
 Dijon
 Metz

Teams relegated to 2018–19 Division 2 Féminine
 Albi
 Marseille

Stadia and locations

League standings

League table

Attendance

Average home attendances
Ranked from highest to lowest average attendance.

Source:

Highest attendances 
Regular season

Source:

Season statistics

Top scorers

Top assists

Hat-tricks

4 Player scored four goals.
5 Player scored five goals.

References

External links
 Official website

Fra
2018
1